National Tertiary Route 741, or just Route 741 (or ) is a National Road Route of Costa Rica, located in the Alajuela province.

Description
In Alajuela province the route covers Zarcero canton (Zarcero, Palmira districts), Sarchí canton (Toro Amarillo district).

References

Highways in Costa Rica